The Battle of Lebanon was a small battle fought near Lebanon, Tennessee during the American Civil War on May 5, 1862.

Background
Union General Ebenezer Dumont pursued Colonel John Hunt Morgan’s Confederate cavalry with a force from the Nashville Garrison.  Dumont's force consisted of detachments from the 1st Kentucky Cavalry under Colonel Frank Lane Wolford, the 4th Kentucky Cavalry under Colonel Green Clay Smith, and the 7th Pennsylvania Cavalry under Colonel Wynkoop.  Morgan's force was the 2nd Kentucky Cavalry Regiment.

Battle
Dumont surprised Morgan early on the morning of May 5, 1862. A 15-mile running battle ensued in which the Confederates were forced to retreat.  During the fighting Confederate sympathizers in the town fired upon the Union Cavalry.  Many of the remaining Confederates barricaded within the buildings surrendered when Dumont threatened to set the town on fire.

Aftermath
150 Confederates were taken prisoner including Lt. Colonel Wood.  Colonels Smith and Wolford of the Union forces were wounded.

References

Lebanon 1862
1862 in the American Civil War
1862 in Tennessee
May 1862 events